The Château de Bricquebec is a castle in the Manche département of France.

The castle is listed as a Monument historique since 1840 by the French Ministry of Culture.

See also
List of castles in France

References

External links

Castles in Manche
History of Manche
Ruined castles in Normandy